Propriano is a commune in the Corse-du-Sud department of France on the island of Corsica.

It is situated on the Valinco Gulf.

Population

Transport 

 Railway stations in Corsica - stillborn branch

See also 
 Communes of the Corse-du-Sud department

References

Communes of Corse-du-Sud
Corse-du-Sud communes articles needing translation from French Wikipedia